Darío Alejandro Grandinetti (born March 5, 1959) is an Argentine actor. He is known for his numerous roles in television, theater and film, where he participated in films by renowned directors such as Alejandro Doria, Pedro Almodóvar and Damián Szifron.

Biography
Darío Grandinetti was born in the city of Rosario, Santa Fe, Argentina. His father worked in the Junta Nacional de Granos in streets of Mendoza and Sarmiento. When Darío Grandinetti was 17 years old he and his family moved to the small town of Las Rosas where they lived only one year and returned to Rosario. In Rosario he played in the inferior teams of Newells Old Boys football club. He began to work in the Junta Nacional de Granos as auxiliary and began studying theater. For reasons of work, he moved to Buenos Aires, Argentina.

Career
Darío Grandinetti started as a television actor and slowly moved towards cinema. His filmography is mainly of Argentine production or co-productions with his country. His first work in a foreign production was the Bolivian El Día que murió el silencio of 1998, and has recently worked in a number of Spanish films, and also participated as guest in Spanish TV series. He is considered one of the most important Argentine actors. In 2012 he won an International Emmy Award for his role in Televisión por la Inclusión.

Personal life

When he was 24 he had an affair with the 40 year old actor Silvia Montanari. She broke off the relationship saying later that it was because of their age difference.

In 1989 he formalized his relationship with Catalan artist Eulalia Lombarte Llorca with whom he had his first two children, María Eulalia and Juan. The couple ended their relationship in the year 1992 with much controversy and a legal battle for the possession of their children that ended up favoring Darío. In October 1993 he met ex-model and Argentine actress Marisa Mondino with whom he married in 1995 and had two daughters, Lucía (1996-1997) who died in 1997 of hydrocephalus, and Laura. The couple ended their relationship in 2006. Finally, after several rumors that linked them together, in 2016 Darío Grandinetti made official his relationship with actress Pastora Vega.

Theater

Television

Films

TV Programs

Awards

References

External links
 
 

Argentine male television actors
1959 births
Living people
Argentine people of Italian descent
International Emmy Award for Best Actor winners
Male actors from Rosario, Santa Fe